Trinidad is a town in the province of Sancti Spíritus, central Cuba. Together with the nearby Valle de los Ingenios, it has been a UNESCO World Heritage Site since 1988, because of its historical importance as a center of the sugar trade in the 18th and 19th centuries. Trinidad is one of the best-preserved cities in the Caribbean from the time when the sugar trade was the main industry in the region.

History
Trinidad was founded on December 23, 1514 by Diego Velázquez de Cuéllar under the name Villa de la Santísima Trinidad.

Hernán Cortés recruited men for his expedition from Juan de Grijalva's home in Trinidad, and Sancti Spíritus, at the start of his 1518 expedition.  This included Pedro de Alvarado and his five brothers.  After ten days, Cortes sailed, the alcayde Francisco Verdugo failing to prevent Cortes from leaving, despite orders from Diego Velázquez.

The Narvaez Expedition landed at Trinidad in 1527 en route to Florida. Caught in a hurricane, the expedition lost two ships, twenty horses and sixty men to the violent storm.

Francisco Iznaga, a Basque landowner in the southern portion of Cuba during the first 30 years of the colonization of Cuba, was elected Mayor of Bayamo in 1540. Iznaga was the originator of a powerful lineage which finally settled in Trinidad where the Torre Iznaga (Iznaga Tower) is. His descendants fought for the independence of Cuba and for annexation to the U.S., from 1820 to 1900.

Geography
The town proper is divided into the barrios (quarters) of Primero, Segundo and Tercero. The whole municipality counts the consejos populares (wards) of Centro, Zona Monumento, Armando Mestre, La Purísima, Casilda, Federación Nacional de Trabajadores Azucareros (FNTA), Condado, Topes de Collante, San Pedro, Manacas - Iznaga, Algarrobo, Pitajones, and Caracusey.

Economy
Nowadays, Trinidad's main industry is tobacco processing. The older parts of town are well preserved, as the Cuban tourism industry sees benefit from tour groups. In contrast, some parts of town outside the tourist areas are very run down and in disrepair, especially in the centre. Tourism from Western nations is major source of income in the city.

Tourism
The city is located on the Caribbean coast near the Escambray Mountains.

Culture

Town

Plaza Mayor

The Plaza Mayor of Trinidad is a plaza and an open-air museum of Spanish Colonial architecture. Only a few square blocks in size, the historic plaza area has cobblestone streets, houses in pastel colors with wrought-iron grilles, and colonial-era edifices such as the Santísima Trinidad Cathedral and Convento de San Francisco. The Municipal History Museum is in town also.

Music
There are several casas de musica, including one next to the cathedral in Plaza Major. There are also discothèques, including one in the ruins of a church; another is in a large cave formerly used as a war time hospital.

Region
Sugar mills
The Valley of the Sugar Mills—Valle de los Ingenios, also a World Heritage Site, has around 70 historic sugar cane mills. They represent the importance of sugar to the Cuban economy since the 18th century.

The valley has la Torre Iznaga, a  tower built by Alejo Iznaga Borrell  in 1816.

Coasts and beaches
 from the city is Topes de Collantes, one of Cuba's premier ecotourism centres. Another attraction is the Casilda Bay, which attracts both snorkelers and divers.

A nearby islet has pristine beaches.  Ancón Beach—Playa Ancón, is a white sand beach and was one of the first new resorts to be developed in Cuba following the 1959 revolution. Along the Ancón Peninsula are three hotels: Hotel Costa Sur (South Coast Hotel), Hotel Ancón, and Brisas Trinidad del Mar.

Demographics
In 2004, the municipality of Trinidad had a population of 73,466.

Photo gallery

Notable people
Manolo Urquiza
Alexandre Arrechea

See also

Alberto Delgado Airport
Valle de los Ingenios
List of cities in Cuba
Municipalities of Cuba

References

External links

 
Cities in Cuba
Populated places in Sancti Spíritus Province
Populated places established in 1514
1510s establishments in the Spanish West Indies
1510s in Cuba
World Heritage Sites in Cuba
1514 establishments in the Spanish Empire